Daud is a 1997 Indian comedy road adventure film written and directed by Ram Gopal Varma, starring Sanjay Dutt and Urmila Matondkar, with music composed by A. R. Rahman. The film was based on Ram Gopal Varma's 1991 cult classic, Kshana Kshanam, which starred Venkatesh, Sridevi and Paresh Rawal.

Plot
The affable Nandu is a small-time crook who is hired to deliver a mysterious package to a notorious criminal named Pinky. Feeling that he's being cheated out of his delivery fee, Nandu holds out for more money, and soon finds himself on the run from both the angry gangsters and the police, who have launched a massive manhunt.

Nandu and Bhavani, the lovely cabaret dancer who's tagging along for the ride, assume the package contains gold; both are unpleasantly surprised when it turns out to be something deadlier: a nuclear bomb.

Cast
 Sanjay Dutt as Nandu/Uma Parvati
 Urmila Matondkar as Bhavani/Daya Shankar
 Paresh Rawal as Pinky
 Neeraj Vora as Chacko
 Ashish Vidyarthi as Nair
 Manoj Bajpayee as Pushkar
 Vineeth as Inspector Sri
 Narsing Yadav as Inspector Rana
 Rajeev Mehta as Khurana
 Rana Jung Bahadur as Commissioner of police
 Sumukhi Pendse as Suvarna

Reception
After the success of his previous movie Rangeela, Verma's Daud was much anticipated. The movie opened to mixed reviews. Anupama Chopra of India Today wrote, "Despite the flaws, Daud makes for fun-watching."

Soundtrack

The score and soundtrack were composed by A. R. Rahman, who also scored Rangeela. The lyrics were written by Mehboob, except for the song "Daud" which was penned by Sukhwinder Singh. One of the songs, "Zehreela Pyar" came heavily under the censor scanner for its rather bold picturization.

The soundtrack was re-released in Tamil as a non-film album titled Ottam and was dubbed in Telugu as 50–50.

Hindi - Original version
Lyrics: Mehboob (Mehboob Aalam Kotwal)

50–50 (Telugu dubbed version)

Lyrics: Sirivennela Seetharama Sastry

Ottam (Tamil dubbed version)

Though the Tamil dubbed version of the film remains unreleased, the soundtrack album released.

Lyrics: Palani Bharathi

References

External links 
 

Indian road movies
Indian chase films
Films directed by Ram Gopal Varma
Indian black comedy films
Indian drama road movies
Films scored by A. R. Rahman
1990s Hindi-language films
Hindi remakes of Telugu films